Maranoa Gardens began in the early 1890s, when Mr John Middleton Watson purchased 1.4 hectares in Balwyn, a suburb of Melbourne, Australia, for a private garden. He planted many Australian and New Zealand native trees and shrubs and the area was maintained purely as a garden. He named the gardens Maranoa after a river in Queensland, from native words meaning flowing, alive or running.

The former City of Camberwell (since merged into the City of Boroondara) acquired the area in 1922 and continued the planting, gradually removing all non-native plants.

In September 1926, Maranoa Gardens were formally opened to the public and Mr F Chapman was appointed Chairman of the Gardens' Consulting Committee. Mr Chapman's keen interest in the Gardens and that of many others helped to establish Maranoa Gardens as one of the largest displays of Australian plants in Victoria.

Contributors to the Gardens' development were Ivo Hammet (a pioneer of Australian native plant growing), Mr Arthur Swaby (a teacher and botanist, who was a founding member of the Society for Growing Australian Plants), Charles French (an associate of the great botanist, Baron Ferdinand von Mueller) and Earnest Lord. The longest serving head gardener at Maranoa, Mr R Bury (1937–1968), preserved and promoted the Gardens' plants.

In 1962, the original Gardens were doubled in size by expanding east into Beckett Park, with the construction of the rockery as the major thrust of this expansion. The variegated Lophostemon was planted near the Beckett Park gates.

Development has been ongoing, including the temperate woodland/heathland in 1986. During 1987, the rockery area was expanded and replanted, the theme of this area being more specific to plants considered more difficult to grow in Melbourne's climate.

Maranoa Gardens is one of the few public gardens in Victoria dedicated to Australian plants, and it is considered to be one of the best. The central arboretum and lawn under trees area date from a time just after Mr Watson transferred ownership to Camberwell Council. Some of the older plants include an Angophora costata Smooth-barked Apple, planted in 1923 and a Stenocarpus sinuatus Queensland Firewheel Tree, planted in 1924.

Other areas of the gardens have been developed to simulate particular plant communities. In the dry sclerophyll forest on the northern side are shrubs and smaller plants that grow well in dry, shady conditions. On the eastern side is a temperate woodland and heathland developed in 1986. The drainage in this area has been improved and low-growing plants such as Dampiera spp. and prostrate wattles, Acacia spp. are featured.

The light grey stony loam over compact mottled clay is poor and the topsoil sets hard when dry while it is soft when wet - and is thus suited to native plants.

A rockery developed in 1962 was rebuilt in 1987–1988 and displays plants that are normally very difficult to grow in Melbourne. Improvement of the drainage and mulching with crushed quartz has provided the conditions suitable for many species from Western Australia to thrive.

With some 5000 plants, most of which are named, Maranoa Gardens has been recognised through registration with the National Trust as an important part of Australian gardening history.

Gallery

References 

Botanical gardens in Victoria (Australia)
Parks in Melbourne
Tourist attractions in Melbourne
1901 establishments in Australia
Gardens in Victoria (Australia)
City of Boroondara